39th Battalion may refer to:

 39th Battalion (Australia), a unit of the Australian Army
 39th (Personnel Support) Battalion, a unit of the Australian Army
 39th Signal Battalion (United States), a unit of the United States Army located in Belgium

See also
 39th Division (disambiguation)
 39th Brigade (disambiguation)
 39th Regiment (disambiguation)
 39th Squadron (disambiguation)